Robert Eshun (born 19 December 1974) is a Ghanaian former professional footballer.

Career
Eshun began his career with Asante Kotoko, scoring in the final of the 1990 FA Cup. He also played in Belgium for Turnhout, Tielen, Lommel and Dessel. He later played in Turkey for Gaziantepspor, and in Malaysia for Sarawak FA.

References

1974 births
Living people
Ghanaian footballers
Asante Kotoko S.C. players
KFC Turnhout players
K.F.C. Lommel S.K. players
Gaziantepspor footballers
K.F.C. Dessel Sport players
Sarawak FA players
Süper Lig players
Ghanaian expatriate footballers
Ghanaian expatriate sportspeople in Belgium
Expatriate footballers in Belgium
Ghanaian expatriate sportspeople in Turkey
Expatriate footballers in Turkey
Ghanaian expatriate sportspeople in Malaysia
Expatriate footballers in Malaysia
Association football defenders